Richard Cockett (born 1961) is a British historian, journalist and writer.

He is a regional editor of The Economist, with experience in Mexico, Central America, Africa and Singapore. He was previously a senior lecturer in politics and history at Royal Holloway, University of London.

Selected works 
 Thinking the unthinkable: think-tanks and the economic counter-revolution, 1931–1983. (Fontana Press, 1995). .
 Sudan: Darfur and the failure of an African State. (Yale University Press, 2010).
 New Left, New Right and Beyond. Taking the Sixties Seriously (with Geoff Andrews, Alan Hooper, Michael Williams) (Palgrave Macmillan, 1999). 
 David Astor and The Observer (Andre Deutsch, 1990). 
 Twilight of Truth: Chamberlain, Appeasement, and the Manipulation of the Press (St. Martin's Press, 1989)

References

External links 
Official Website

British male journalists
British historians
British economics writers
Academics of Royal Holloway, University of London
The Economist people
1961 births
Living people